Michael McGurk (ca. 1883 – 23 June 1948) was a nationalist politician and farmer in Northern Ireland.

McGurk became active in the Irish Home Rule campaign in the early 1900s.  He was subsequently elected to Tyrone County Council and Cookstown Rural District Council.

McGurk was elected to the Parliament of Northern Ireland as an Independent Nationalist and Farmers' candidate at a by-election in Mid Tyrone in 1941.  He held the seat at the 1945 Northern Ireland general election, and was active mainly on agricultural issues. In Parliament, he sat with the Nationalist Party group.

References

1948 deaths
Members of Tyrone County Council
Members of the House of Commons of Northern Ireland 1938–1945
Members of the House of Commons of Northern Ireland 1945–1949
Nationalist Party (Ireland) politicians
Members of the House of Commons of Northern Ireland for County Tyrone constituencies
Year of birth uncertain